Jean-Jacques Winders (14 May 1849 – 20 February 1936) was a Belgian architect.

He designed the Royal Museum of Fine Arts in Antwerp with Frans Van Dijk, the  monument and his own house De Passer from 1883, which was protected as a monument in Belgium in 1981. Initially he designed buildings in an eclectic style, from 1880 his designs were in the Flemish neo-Renaissance style, of which his house is a typical example.

Biography

Joannes Jacobus Henricus Victor Winders was born in Antwerp on 14 May 1849. He came from an Antwerp family that was active in the construction industry. His grandfather was a contractor and his father, Jean-Baptiste Winders, was a contractor-architect who, from 1859, played a role in the construction of the Brialmont Forts around the city. The young Jean-Jacques Winders followed in his father's footsteps, attending his father's construction sites since he was 17. He then studied at the Royal Academy of Fine Arts of Antwerp. By 1868 he had established himself as an architect, realizing the Antwerp house of painter Jules Wagner that year.

His first remarkable assignment was the Monument  in Antwerp. He won the design competition for the monument in 1873, and although it was supposed to be finished by the next year, delays postponed its inauguration, which took place in 1883. Another important assignment was the Royal Museum of Fine Arts in Antwerp, which he designed with Frans Van Dijk. Winders' style was initially eclectic, but in the late 1870s he drastically change his style to Flemish neo-Renaissence style, of which he became one of the most important exponents. His most important work in this style is his own house, Den Passer on Tolstraat in Antwerp.

Winders was also a teacher, and taught at the Royal Academy of Fine Arts of Antwerp from 1895.

His son Max followed in his footsteps becoming an architect as well.

Selected works 
 1873–1883: Monument Schelde Vrij on Marnixplaats in Antwerp
 1885: Tobacco factory Stanislas Pauwels on Wijngaardstraat in Antwerp
 1883: Entrepot Steenacker on Sanderusstraat in Antwerp
 1884–1990: Royal Museum of Fine Arts of Antwerp with Frans Van Dijk
 1885: Town Hall of Gilly
 1896: Town Hall of Emblem
 1906: Post Office of Mortsel

References

Further reading 
 Bart VAN LAEKEN, Jean-Jacques Winders, in het Nationaal Biografisch Woordenboek, deel 16, kol. 887–890, Brussel, 2002
 Herman STYNEN, "Kunst brengt gunst", Jean Jacques Winders (1849–1936) en de neo-Vlaamse renaissance, in: Monumenten & Landschappen, pp. 6–26, Brussel, 1986
 Jacques LAVALLEYE, Jean-Jacques Winders, in de Biographie Nationale, deel 35, kol. 754–755, Brussel, 1970
 Paul SAINTENOY,Notice sur Jean-Jacques Winders, in Annuaire de l'Académie royale de Belgique 1937, pp. 31–46, Brussel, 1937

External links 
 
 Biography at www.schoonselhof.be
 Biography Archives d'Architectes Modernes
 List of designs and works by Winders

1849 births
1936 deaths
19th-century Belgian architects
20th-century Belgian architects
Artists from Antwerp